WHH GT 18 is a standard residential high-rise building type in East Berlin. It was developed by architects Helmut Stingl and Joachim Seifert between 1969 and 1971 using large panel construction for mixed-use housing in Berlin.

The acronym refers to the type WHH (Wohnhochhaus, residential tower), the GT stands for Großtafelbauweise (applied large-panel construction), and 18 for the number of storeys. The building is a detached structure or high point under the name of WHH GT 18/21 double as high-rise with 21 floors, with a load level of 6.3 tonnes. Depending on the version of the developed type, it contains 136 or 296 apartments. It is one of the largest large panel construction types in the former GDR.

The first example of this building type was erected in 1971 at the Holzmarktstraße in East Berlin. With the redevelopment of Fischerinsel, modified version of this series were built. From 1972 onward they were used in almost all East Berlin housing development projects. In contrast to the mostly 11-storey building with buildings of WBS 70 these buildings dominated high-rise urban construction. They were built near major road intersections, or in the vicinity of high capacity public transportation, such as subway or train stations.

Specifications

 Principal material: Large panels of lightweight concrete
 Mass of the finished parts: a maximum of 6.3 t
 Structural grid: nominally 3.60 × 3.60 m
 Exterior walls:
 100 mm of B300 concrete
 50 mm polystyrene rigid insulation
 60 mm concrete
 Interior walls: 190 mm thick, 300 B reinforced and unreinforced concrete
 Floor structure: 3.60 m span, 14 cm thick steel reinforced B300 concrete
 Incorporation type: Continuous steel slab thickness of 1.00 m and
 60 cm concrete slab for installation ducts
 Monolithic part in situ : first floor height of 4.20 m
 Roof shape and type of roof: low-slope roof, insulated
 Heat supply from district heating
 Home automation and transformer station on the ground floor
 Two elevators and exterior stairwell 3

References

External links

Apartment types
Housing in Germany
Economy of East Germany